Martin Smolka (born 11 August 1959 in Prague) is a contemporary Czech composer of classical music.

Works 
1983
 Slzy (Tears);

1985-1988
 Hudba hudbička (Music Sweet Music) for ensemble;

1988
 Music for Retuned Instruments;

1989
 Zvonění (Ringing) for solo percussion;
 Nocturne;

1990
 L’Orch pour l’orch;

1990-1992
 Netopýr (The Flying Dog);

1992
 Rain, a Window, Roofs, Chimneys, Pigeons and so... and Railway-Bridges, too;

1993
 Trzy motywy pastoralne (Three pastoral motifs);

1993-1995
 Rent a Ricercar;

1996
 Euforium;
 Three pieces for retuned orchestra;

1996-1997
 : Lullaby;

1998
 8 pieces for guitar quartet;
 Autumn Thoughts for ensemble;

1999
 Lieder ohne Worte und Passacaglia;
 Nešť for orchestra;
 Like Those Nicéan Barks of Yore for trombone and life electronics;

2000
 Blue Note;
 Walden, the Distiller of Celestial Dews;
 Remix, Redream, Reflight;
 Houby a nebe (Mushrooms and Heaven), Czech text Petr Pavel Fiala and Martin Smolka;

2001
 Geigenlieder, German text Christian Morgenstern and Bertolt Brecht;

2001-2003
 Nagano - Opera, libretto Jaroslav Dušek and Martin Smolka;
 Observing the Clouds;

2002
 Missa;
 Ach, mé milé c moll (Oh, my admired C minor);

2003
 Solitudo;

2003-2004
 Tesknice (Nostalgia);

2004
 Hats in the Sky;
 For a Buck;

2005
 Das schlaue Gretchen opera for children, libretto Klaus Angermann;

2006
 Lamento metodico;
 Słone i smutne (Salt and Sad), Polish text Tadeusz Różewicz;
 Semplice;

2010
 fff (Fortissimo feroce Fittipaldi) for saxophone, piano and percussion - written for Trio Accanto;

Discography 
 Hudba hudbička, ensemble AGON, Arta Records, Prague 1991 
 Music for Retuned Instruments, ensemble recherche, Wittener Tage für neue Kammermusik 1991, WDR Köln 1991 
 Rain, a Window, Roofs, Chimneys, Pigeons and so... and Railway-Bridges, too, col legno München/SWF Baden-Baden, Donaueschinger Musiktage 1992
 A v sadech korálů, jež slabě zrůžověly, Petr Matuszek - bariton, Martin Smolka - piano, Na prahu světla, Happy Music, Prague 1996 
 Rent a Ricercar, Flying Dog, For Woody Allen, Nocturne, AGON Orchestra, audio ego/Society for New Music Prague, 1997
 Euphorium, Rain, a Window, Roofs, Chimneys, Pigeons and so... and Railway-Bridges, too, Music for Retuned Instruments, Ringing, AGON Orchestra, audio ego/Society for New Music Prague, 1998
 Walden, the Distiller of Celestial Dews, SWR Vokalensemble Stuttgart, Meinhard Jenne – percussion, Rupert Huber - conductor, Donaueschinger Musiktage 2000
 fff (Fortissimo feroce Fittipaldi), Trio Accanto, Wergo (forthcoming)

External links 
 http://www.martinsmolka.com/en/index.html - Homepage
 Extensive interview with Martin Smolka in English, on Opera Lively

1959 births
20th-century classical composers
21st-century classical composers
Czech classical composers
Czech male classical composers
Czech film score composers
Male film score composers
Living people
Microtonal musicians
Czech opera composers
Male opera composers
20th-century Czech male musicians
21st-century Czech male musicians